Kendall Cornine (born December 17, 1996) is an American ice hockey forward, currently playing in the Premier Hockey Federation (PHF) with the Metropolitan Riveters.

Playing career   
Cornine graduated from Morristown–Beard School, a private secondary school in  Morris County, New Jersey, where she set the school's career scoring record with 199 points (104 goals + 95 assists) in just 74 games. As a senior, she also played with the East Coast Wizards U19 team of the Eastern Women's Hockey Conference (EWHC). She was named the New Jersey Devils High School Player of the Year twice, in 2014 and 2015, and was the 2015 New Jersey Girls High School Player of the Year.

In 2015, Cornine joined the RIT Tigers women's ice hockey program in the College Hockey America (CHA) conference of the NCAA Division I. She went on to set the team career scoring record at the NCAA Division I level with 64 points (34+26) across 140 games and served as Rochester captain in her final two seasons.

Cornine was drafted in the second round, 6th overall in the 2018 NWHL Draft by the Metropolitan Riveters, the first player from the Rochester Institute of Technology (RIT) in history to be drafted into the NWHL. She scored 24 points in 24 games in her rookie professional season, finishing tied for second on the Riveters in goals, being named to the 2020 NWHL All-Star Game, and picking up the nickname "Score-nine."

She re-signed with the Riveters in March 2020, becoming the first player in the league to re-sign for the 2020–21 NWHL season.

Career statistics

References

External links
 

1996 births
Living people
American women's ice hockey forwards
Ice hockey players from New Jersey
Metropolitan Riveters players
Morristown-Beard School alumni
People from Livingston, New Jersey
RIT Tigers women's ice hockey players
Sportspeople from Essex County, New Jersey